The 1986 NatWest Trophy was the 6th NatWest Trophy.  It was an English limited overs county cricket tournament which was held between 25 June and 6 September 1986. The tournament was won by Sussex who defeated Lancashire by 7 wickets in the final at Lord's.

Summary
The seventeen first-class counties, were joined by thirteen Minor Counties: Berkshire, Cambridgeshire, Cheshire, Cornwall, Cumberland, Devon, Dorset, Durham, Hertfordshire, Northumberland, Oxfordshire, Staffordshire and Suffolk.  The Ireland and Scotland teams also participated.

Teams who won in the first round progressed to the second round. The winners in the second round then progressed to the quarter-final stage.  Winners from the quarter-finals then progressed to the semi-finals from which the winners then went on to the final at Lord's which was held on 6 September 1986.

In the first round at Derby, Derbyshire batsmen Alan Hill and Iain Anderson put on a then record partnership for any wicket in limited overs cricket. 286, for the 2nd wicket versus Cornwall. The semi-final between Worcestershire and Sussex at Worcester took three days to complete due to bad weather. Sussex won by 5 wickets and Imran Khan was the man of the match. At The Oval, Lancashire won by 4 runs Trevor Jesty scored 112 and was man of the match for Surrey.

In the final, Ian Gould's Sussex beat Lancashire by 7 wickets. Medium pace bowler Dermot Reeve took 4-20 and was man of the match. Paul Parker scored the highest score of the game, 85. This was the last big game for Lancashire, and former West Indies, captain Clive Lloyd who retired at the end of the season.

First round

Second round

Quarter-finals

Semi-finals

Final

References

External links
CricketArchive tournament page 

Friends Provident Trophy seasons
Natwest Trophy, 1986
NatWest Group